Dushanovë is the largest village in the District of Prizren, Kosovo.

Notes

References 

Villages in Prizren